The modern Japanese writing system uses a combination of logographic kanji, which are adopted Chinese characters, and syllabic kana. Kana itself consists of a pair of syllabaries: hiragana, used primarily for native or naturalised Japanese words and grammatical elements; and katakana, used primarily for foreign words and names, loanwords, onomatopoeia, scientific names, and sometimes for emphasis. Almost all written Japanese sentences contain a mixture of kanji and kana. Because of this mixture of scripts, in addition to a large inventory of kanji characters, the Japanese writing system is considered to be one of the most complicated currently in use.

Several thousand kanji characters are in regular use, which mostly originate from traditional Chinese characters. Others made in Japan are referred to as “Japanese kanji” (also known as “country’s kanji” ). Each character has an intrinsic meaning (or range of meanings), and most have more than one pronunciation, the choice of which depends on context. Japanese primary and secondary school students are required to learn 2,136 jōyō kanji as of 2010. The total number of kanji is well over 50,000, though few if any native speakers know anywhere near this number. 

In modern Japanese, the hiragana and katakana syllabaries each contain 46 basic characters, or 71 including diacritics. With one or two minor exceptions, each different sound in the Japanese language (that is, each different syllable, strictly each mora) corresponds to one character in each syllabary. Unlike kanji, these characters intrinsically represent sounds only; they convey meaning only as part of words. Hiragana and katakana characters also originally derive from Chinese characters, but they have been simplified and modified to such an extent that their origins are no longer visually obvious.

Texts without kanji are rare; most are either children's books — since children tend to know few kanji at an early age — or early electronics such as computers, phones, and video games, which could not display complex graphemes like kanji due to both graphical and computational limitations.

To a lesser extent, modern written Japanese also uses initialisms from the Latin alphabet, for example in terms such as  "BC/AD", "a.m./p.m.", "FBI", and "CD". Romanized Japanese is most frequently used by foreign students of Japanese who have not yet mastered kana, and by native speakers for computer input.

Use of scripts

Kanji
 are logographic characters (based on traditional ones) taken from Chinese script and used in the writing of Japanese. 

It is known from archaeological evidence that the first contacts that the Japanese had with Chinese writing took place in the 1st century AD, during the late Yayoi period. However, the Japanese people of that era probably had little to no comprehension of the script, and they would remain relatively illiterate until the 5th century AD in the Kofun period, when writing in Japan became more widespread.

They are used to write most content words of native Japanese or (historically) Chinese origin, which include the following:

(Certain names may be written in hiragana or katakana, or some combination of these, plus kanji.)

Some Japanese words are written with different kanji depending on the specific usage of the word—for instance, the word naosu (to fix, or to cure) is written  when it refers to curing a person, and  when it refers to fixing an object.

Most kanji have more than one possible pronunciation (or "reading"), and some common kanji have many. These are broadly divided into on'yomi, which are readings that approximate to a Chinese pronunciation of the character at the time it was adopted into Japanese, and kun'yomi, which are pronunciations of native Japanese words that correspond to the meaning of the kanji character.

Unusual or nonstandard kanji readings may be glossed using furigana. Kanji compounds are sometimes given arbitrary readings for stylistic purposes. The word , meaning "connection", is normally pronounced setsuzoku.

Kana

Hiragana 
 emerged as a manual simplification via cursive script of the most phonetically widespread kanji among those who could read and write during the Heian period (794-1185). The main creators of the current hiragana were ladies of the Japanese imperial court, that used the script in the writing of personal communications and literature. 

Hiragana is used to write the following:

various function words, including most grammatical particles, or postpositions—small, usually common words that, for example, mark sentence topics, subjects and objects or have a purpose similar to English prepositions such as "in", "to", "from", "by" and "for".
miscellaneous other words of various grammatical types that lack a kanji rendition, or whose kanji is obscure, difficult to typeset, or considered too difficult to understand for the context (such as in children's books).
—phonetic renderings of kanji placed above or beside the kanji character. Furigana may aid children or non-native speakers or clarify nonstandard, rare, or ambiguous readings, especially for words that use kanji not part of the jōyō kanji list.

There is also some flexibility for words with common kanji renditions to be instead written in hiragana, depending on the individual author's preference (all Japanese words can be spelled out entirely in hiragana or katakana, even when they are normally written using kanji). Some words are colloquially written in hiragana and writing them in kanji might give them a more formal tone, while hiragana may impart a softer or more emotional feeling.

Some lexical items that are normally written using kanji have become grammaticalized in certain contexts, where they are instead written in hiragana. For example, the root of the verb  (miru, "see") is normally written with the kanji  for the mi portion.

Katakana 
 emerged around the 9th century, in the Heian period, when Buddhist monks created a syllabary derived from Chinese characters to simplify their reading, using portions of the characters as a kind of shorthand. The origin of the alphabet is attributed to the monk Kūkai.

Katakana is used to write the following:

However, some foreign borrowings that were naturalized may be rendered in hiragana, such as たばこ (tabako, "tobacco"), which comes from Portuguese. See also Transcription into Japanese.
emphasis, much like italicisation in European languages.

Katakana can also be used to impart the idea that words are spoken in a foreign or otherwise unusual accent; for example, the speech of a robot.

Rōmaji
The first contact of the Japanese with the Latin alphabet occurred in the 16th century, during the Muromachi period, when they had contact with Portuguese navigators, the first European people to visit the Japanese islands. The earliest Japanese romanization system was based on Portuguese orthography. It was developed around 1548 by a Japanese Catholic named Anjirō.

The Latin alphabet is used to write the following:

Latin-alphabet acronyms and initialisms, such as NATO or UFO
Japanese personal names, corporate brands, and other words intended for international use (for example, on business cards, in passports, etc.)
foreign names, words, and phrases, often in scholarly contexts
foreign words deliberately rendered to impart a foreign flavour, for instance, in commercial contexts

Arabic numerals
Arabic numerals (as opposed to traditional kanji numerals) are often used to write numbers in horizontal text, especially when numbering things rather than indicating a quantity, such as telephone numbers, serial numbers and addresses. Arabic numerals were introduced in Japan probably at the same time as the Latin alphabet, in the 16th century during the Muromachi period, the first contact being via Portuguese navigators. These numerals did not originate in Europe, as the Portuguese inherited them during the Arab occupation of the Iberian peninsula. See also Japanese numerals.

Hentaigana
, a set of archaic kana made obsolete by the Meiji reformation, are sometimes used to impart an archaic flavor, like in items of food (esp. soba).

Additional mechanisms
Jukujikun refers to instances in which words are written using kanji that reflect the meaning of the word though the pronunciation of the word is entirely unrelated to the usual pronunciations of the constituent kanji. Conversely, ateji refers to the employment of kanji that appear solely to represent the sound of the compound word but are, conceptually, utterly unrelated to the signification of the word.

Examples
Sentences are commonly written using a combination of all three Japanese scripts: kanji (in red), hiragana (in purple), and katakana (in orange), and in limited instances also include
Latin alphabet characters (in green) and Arabic numerals (in black):

The same text can be transliterated to the Latin alphabet (rōmaji), although this will generally only be done for the convenience of foreign language speakers:

Translated into English, this reads:

All words in modern Japanese can be written using hiragana, katakana, and rōmaji, while only some have Kanji. Words that have no dedicated kanji may still be written with kanji by employing either ateji (like in man'yogana, から = 可良) or jukujikun, like in the title of とある科学の超電磁砲 (超電磁砲 being used to represent レールガン).

Although rare, there are some words that use all three scripts in the same word. An example of this is the term くノ一 (rōmaji: kunoichi), which uses a hiragana, a katakana, and a kanji character, in that order. It is said that if all three characters are put in the same kanji "square", they all combine to create the kanji  (woman/female).

Statistics
A statistical analysis of a corpus of the Japanese newspaper Asahi Shimbun from the year 1993 (around 56.6 million tokens) revealed:

Collation 
Collation (word ordering) in Japanese is based on the kana, which express the pronunciation of the words, rather than the kanji. The kana may be ordered using two common orderings, the prevalent gojūon (fifty-sound) ordering, or the old-fashioned iroha ordering. Kanji dictionaries are usually collated using the radical system, though other systems, such as SKIP, also exist.

Direction of writing 

Traditionally, Japanese is written in a format called , which was inherited from traditional Chinese practice. In this format, the characters are written in columns going from top to bottom, with columns ordered from right to left. After reaching the bottom of each column, the reader continues at the top of the column to the left of the current one.

Modern Japanese also uses another writing format, called . This writing format is horizontal and reads from left to right, as in English.

A book printed in tategaki opens with the spine of the book to the right, while a book printed in yokogaki opens with the spine to the left.

Spacing and punctuation 

Japanese is normally written without spaces between words, and text is allowed to wrap from one line to the next without regard for word boundaries. This convention was originally modelled on Chinese writing, where spacing is superfluous because each character is essentially a word in itself (albeit compounds are common). However, in kana and mixed kana/kanji text, readers of Japanese must work out where word divisions lie based on an understanding of what makes sense. In rōmaji, it may sometimes be ambiguous whether an item should be transliterated as two words or one.

Words in potentially unfamiliar foreign compounds, normally transliterated in katakana, may be separated by a punctuation mark called a nakaguro ("middle dot") to aid Japanese readers. For example,  (Bill Gates). This punctuation is also occasionally used to separate native Japanese words, especially in concatenations of kanji characters where there might otherwise be confusion or ambiguity about interpretation, and especially for the full names of people.

The Japanese full stop (。) and comma (、) are used for similar purposes to their English equivalents, though comma usage can be more fluid than is the case in English. The question mark (？) is not used in traditional or formal Japanese, but it may be used in informal writing, or in transcriptions of dialogue where it might not otherwise be clear that a statement was intoned as a question. The exclamation mark (！)  is restricted to informal writing. Colons and semicolons are available but are not common in ordinary text. Quotation marks are written as 「 ... 」, and nested quotation marks as 『 ... 』. Several bracket styles and dashes are available.

History of the Japanese script

Importation of kanji 

Japan's first encounters with Chinese characters may have come as early as the 1st century AD with the King of Na gold seal, said to have been given by Emperor Guangwu of Han in AD 57 to a Japanese emissary.  However, it is unlikely that the Japanese became literate in Chinese writing any earlier than the 4th century AD.

Initially Chinese characters were not used for writing Japanese, as literacy meant fluency in Classical Chinese, not the vernacular. Eventually a system called  developed, which, along with kanji and something very similar to Chinese grammar, employed diacritics to hint at the Japanese translation. Even today Japanese high schools and some junior high schools teach kanbun as part of the curriculum.

The development of man'yōgana 
Some scholars claim that man'yōgana originated from Baekje, but this hypothesis is denied by mainstream Japanese scholars. The modern kana, namely hiragana and katakana, are simplifications and systemizations of man'yōgana.

Due to the large number of words and concepts entering Japan from China which had no native equivalent, many words entered Japanese directly, with a similar pronunciation to the original Chinese. At the same time, native Japanese already had words corresponding to many borrowed kanji. Authors increasingly used kanji to represent these words. A kanji may have none, one, or several on'yomi and kun'yomi. Okurigana are written after the initial kanji for verbs and adjectives to give inflection and to help disambiguate a particular kanji's reading. The same character may be read several different ways depending on the word.

Some linguists have compared the Japanese borrowing of Chinese-derived vocabulary as akin to the influx of Romance vocabulary into English during the Norman conquest of England. Like English, Japanese has many synonyms of differing origin, with words from both Chinese and native Japanese. Sino-Japanese is often considered more formal or literary, just as latinate words in English often mark a higher register.

Script reforms

Meiji period 
The significant reforms of the 19th century Meiji era did not initially impact the Japanese writing system. However, the language itself was changing due to the increase in literacy resulting from education reforms, the massive influx of words (both borrowed from other languages or newly coined), and the ultimate success of movements such as the influential  which resulted in Japanese being written in the colloquial form of the language instead of the wide range of historical and classical styles used previously. The difficulty of written Japanese was a topic of debate, with several proposals in the late 19th century that the number of kanji in use be limited. In addition, exposure to non-Japanese texts led to unsuccessful proposals that Japanese be written entirely in kana or rōmaji.  This period saw Western-style punctuation marks introduced into Japanese writing.

In 1900, the Education Ministry introduced three reforms aimed at improving the process of education in Japanese writing:

 standardization of hiragana, eliminating the range of hentaigana then in use;
 restriction of the number of kanji taught in elementary schools to about 1,200;
 reform of the irregular kana representation of the Sino-Japanese readings of kanji to make them conform with the pronunciation.

The first two of these were generally accepted, but the third was hotly contested, particularly by conservatives, to the extent that it was withdrawn in 1908.

Pre–World War II 
The partial failure of the 1900 reforms combined with the rise of nationalism in Japan effectively prevented further significant reform of the writing system. The period before World War II saw numerous proposals to restrict the number of kanji in use, and several newspapers voluntarily restricted their kanji usage and increased usage of furigana; however, there was no official endorsement of these, and indeed much opposition. However, one successful reform was the standardization of hiragana, which involved reducing the possibilities of writing down Japanese morae down to only one hiragana character per morae, which led to labeling all the other previously used hiragana as hentaigana and discarding them in daily use.

Post–World War II 
The period immediately following World War II saw a rapid and significant reform of the writing system. This was in part due to influence of the Occupation authorities, but to a significant extent was due to the removal of traditionalists from control of the educational system, which meant that previously stalled revisions could proceed. The major reforms were:

—alignment of kana usage with modern pronunciation, replacing the old historical kana usage (1946);
promulgation of various restricted sets of kanji:
 (1946), a collection of 1850 characters for use in schools, textbooks, etc.;
kanji to be used in schools (1949);
simplifications of various complex kanji letter-forms .

At one stage, an advisor in the Occupation administration proposed a wholesale conversion to rōmaji, but it was not endorsed by other specialists and did not proceed.

In addition, the practice of writing horizontally in a right-to-left direction was generally replaced by left-to-right writing. The right-to-left order was considered a special case of vertical writing, with columns one character high, rather than horizontal writing per se; it was used for single lines of text on signs, etc. (e.g., the station sign at Tokyo reads ).

The post-war reforms have mostly survived, although some of the restrictions have been relaxed. The replacement of the tōyō kanji in 1981 with the 1,945 —a modification of the tōyō kanji—was accompanied by a change from "restriction" to "recommendation", and in general the educational authorities have become less active in further script reform.

The jōyō kanji list was extended to 2,136 characters in 2010.

Romanization

There are a number of methods of rendering Japanese in Roman letters.  The Hepburn method of romanization, designed for English speakers, is a de facto standard widely used inside and outside Japan. The Kunrei-shiki system has a better correspondence with Japanese phonology, which makes it easier for native speakers to learn. It is officially endorsed by the Ministry of Education and often used by non-native speakers who are learning Japanese as a second language. Other systems of romanization include Nihon-shiki, JSL, and Wāpuro rōmaji.

Lettering styles
Shodō
Edomoji
Minchō
East Asian sans-serif typeface

Variant writing systems
Gyaru-moji
Hentaigana
Man'yōgana

See also

Genkō yōshi (graph paper for writing Japanese)
Iteration mark (Japanese duplication marks)
Japanese typographic symbols (non-kana, non-kanji symbols)
Japanese Braille
Japanese language and computers
Japanese manual syllabary

Chinese writing system
Okinawan writing system
Kaidā glyphs (Yonaguni)

Siddhaṃ script (Indic alphabet used for Buddhist scriptures)

References

Sources

External links
 The Modern Japanese Writing System: an excerpt from Literacy and Script Reform in Occupation Japan, by J. Marshall Unger.
 The 20th Century Japanese Writing System: Reform and Change by Christopher Seeley
 Japanese Hiragana Conversion API by NTT Resonant
 Japanese Morphological Analysis API by NTT Resonant

 
Writing systems without word boundaries